The Hare quota (also known as the simple quota) is a formula used under some forms of proportional representation. In these voting systems the quota is the number of votes that guarantees a candidate, or a party in some cases, captures a seat. The Hare quota is the total number of votes divided by the number of seats to be filled. This is the simplest quota, but the Droop quota is mostly used currently. 

The Hare quota can be used in the single transferable vote (STV-Hare) system and the largest remainder method (LR-Hare) and other quota rule compatible methods of party-list proportional representation. Both versions are named after the political scientist Thomas Hare, but the largest remainder method in which it is used is also sometimes called the Hare–Niemeyer method (after Horst Niemeyer) or the Hamilton method (after Alexander Hamilton).

Formula
The Hare quota may be given as:

where
Total votes = the total valid poll; that is, the number of valid (unspoilt) votes cast in an election.
Total seats = the total number of seats to be filled in the election.

Use in STV 
The Hare quota is the simplest quota that can be used in elections held under the STV system. In an STV election a candidate who reaches the quota is elected while any votes a candidate receives above the quota are transferred to another candidate.

The Hare quota was devised by Thomas Hare, one of the earliest supporters of STV. In 1868, Henry Richmond Droop (1831–1884) invented the Droop quota as an alternative to the Hare quota, and Droop is now widely used, the Hare quota today being rarely used with STV.

Example 
To see how the Hare quota works in an STV election, imagine an election in which there are 2 seats to be filled and 3 candidates: Andrea, Brad, and Carter. One hundred voters voted, each casting one vote but some with back-up preferences. There are 100 ballots showing preferences as follows:

Because there are 100 voters and 2 seats, the Hare quota is:

To begin the count the first preferences cast for each candidate are tallied and are as follows:

Andrea: 60
Carter: 14
Brad: 26

Andrea has more than 50 votes. She therefore has reached the quota and is declared elected. She has 10 votes more than the quota so these votes are transferred to Carter, as specified on the ballots. The tallies therefore now become:

Carter: 24
Brad: 26

At this stage, there are only two candidates remaining and one seat open. The most popular candidate is declared elected and the other is declared defeated.

Although Brad has not reached the quota, he is declared elected since he has more votes than Carter.

The winners are therefore Andrea and Brad.

Use in party-list PR 
In Brazil's largest remainder system the Hare quota is used to set the minimum number of seats allocated to each party or coalition. Remaining seats are allocated according to the D'Hondt method. This procedure is used for the Federal Chamber of Deputies, State Assemblies, Municipal and Federal District Chambers.

Compared to some similar methods, the use of the Hare quota with the largest remainder method tends to favour the smaller parties at the expense of the larger ones. Thus in Hong Kong the use of the Hare quota has prompted political parties to nominate their candidates on separate tickets, as under this system this may increase the number of seats they obtain. The Democratic Party, for example, filled three separate tickets in the 8-seat New Territories West constituency in the 2008 Legislative Council elections. In the 2012 election, no candidate list won more than one seat in any of the six PR constituencies (a total of 40 seats). In Hong Kong the Hare quota system has effectively become a multi-member single-vote system in the territory. This formula also rewards political alliances and parties of small-to-moderate size and discourages broader unions which led to the fragmentation of the political parties and electoral alliances rather than expanding them.

Comparison with the Droop quota

The Droop quota is smaller than the Hare quota, and is considered more efficient when counting ballots—since a candidate needs only the smaller quota to be elected, the winners are often determined with fewer counting rounds. Overall the two quotas give mostly similar results. However the results often differ, particularly with regard to the allocation of the last seat, which is determined after vote transfers. In the above example, using the Droop quota (34), more of Andrea's votes would be transferred with some going to Carter and Carter would win the second seat by having about 34 votes, which would be more than Brad's 26.
In a multi-winner election, the Hare quota is kinder to small parties than the Droop quota because they have a slightly better chance to win the final seat, the previous winner's votes being wasted in un-transferred surplus votes. (As well, Droop is smaller than Hare so a small party may have enough votes to pass the Droop quota but not Hare if it had been used.)
In an open list multi-winner election under the Hare quota it is possible for a party supported by a clear majority of voters to receive only a minority of seats if the votes are not dispersed relatively evenly across all the party's candidates. Thus the principle of majority rule favors the Droop quota.  Single Transferable Voting using either Hare or Droop, being district-level systems that do not guarantee overall proportionality of representation, can see a party that has majority of the votes not take a majority of the seats and see a party with a minority of the votes take a majority of the seats overall (but it happens less often than under {{first-past-the-post voting]]) and the degree of mis-representation is much less than can happen under {{first-past-the-post voting]]).
In an Alternative Voting (Instant-runoff voting) election, an election using preferential voting where there is only one seat to be filled, bare majority (Droop quota) is used. There is no transfer of surplus votes. When the seat has not been filled and there are only two remaining candidates, the candidate with more votes (a majority) is elected.

As shown in the example, quota does not enter it once the field of candidates is thinned to just one more than the number of remaining open seats. Brad's election would have been the same whether Droop or Hare had been used.

The Droop quota is today the most frequently used quota for STV elections.

Criticisms
The Hare quota is often criticised for favouring the smaller parties at the expense of the larger ones.

Under certain circumstances, the Hare quota can also lead to a situation in which the outcome of the election depends on the order in which the votes were counted. If a candidate fulfils the quota, it is not obvious which of their single transferable votes should be distributed and which should get "used up" electing the candidate. This problem can be eliminated by fully distributing fractional votes rather than partially distributing full votes, as in the Gregory system, which is used in Irish Senate elections.

The Hare quota in Hong Kong's largest remainder system, 1998–2012 
In some cases, it leads to the fragmentation and infighting of the electoral alliances. In Hong Kong, the 1998 Legislative Council election, pro-democracy camp organization The Frontier fails to co-ordinate two former legislators (1995–1997) Lee Cheuk-yan and Leung Yiu-chung into a two-candidate list running for New Territories West (NT West) 5-seat constituency, and Leung left The Frontier, running as Nonpartisan candidate with the support of Neighbourhood and Worker's Service Centre in NT West and Lee running as Frontier candidate in NT West. Lee and Leung won the last two seats by around 10% votes (Lee 12.45% and Leung 10.30%), in case they ran in a single list with same election result(12.45% + 10.30% = 22.75%), they would win the first seat by full quota (20% as a 5-seat constituency) and the remainder(2.75%) is smaller than the candidate list standing for Indigenous inhabitants of the New Territories, which leaded by vice-chairman of the Heung Yee Kuk - Lam Wai-keung (6.91%), this election result mean "infighting" may benefit the political alliance.

In 2000 Hong Kong legislative election, the second legislative election using the Hare quota largest remainder method, fragmentation and infighting within the parties and camps were shown because political parties began to split their lists in order to waste fewer votes as purchasing seats with remainder votes is always more efficient than purchasing them with full quotas under the Hare quota. For instance, the Democratic Party ran multiple lists by filling two lists in New Territories East and three lists in New Territories West, in which incumbent Lee Wing-tat's list was lost to his party colleague Albert Chan's list in the latter constituency. In 2004, the ADPL joined the Democrats by splitting lists in Kowloon West. 

In 2008, pro-Beijing DAB and Savantas Policy Institute candidate lists aimed to win 2 seats for their list in 6-seat Hong Kong Island constituency, however due to high popularity between two lists in pro-Beijing camp, both lists got around 19% votes, which lost the "third" seat of pro-Beijing camp to Civic Party(26.4% votes) Audrey Eu who won the seat by the remainder(26.4% = 16.6% + 9.8% which is larger than 19% = 16.6% + 2.4%), the "meaningful" pro-Beijing camp strategy would be trying to win 3 seats by distributing the votes evenly into 3 candidate lists. 

In 2012, the pro-Beijing DAB deployed multiple lists for the first time. As a result, of the 34 seats captured by lists from the two major camps, only three were won by full quota. Due to strong network of pro-Beijing camp with its affiliated grassroots and community organisations, pro-Beijing camp was able to split the votes evenly to get more candidates to be elected with fewer votes, pro-Beijing camp won the last seats in 4 out of 5 constituencies and total 17 of 35 geographical Constituency seats with 42.66% shares of votes, compared with Pan-democrats 56.24% shares of votes winning 18 seats.

The Hare quota used in Hong Kong's largest remainder system also encourages the multiplication of political parties and nonpartisan candidates. The vote share of the largest party Democratic Party dropped significantly, from 43 per cent in 1998 to 29 per cent in 2000, to 21 per cent in 2004, rising slightly to 20 per cent in 2008 and falling again to 14 per cent in 2012. As under the Hare quota largest remainder method the broad alliance wins little or no seat bonus, whereas much smaller lists win larger bonuses in the elections, politicians and potential allies are motivated to diverge rather than to coalesce. On the other hands, candidate with radical stand won seats starting from 2004, which expanded the exposure of radical stand among Hong Kong general public.

The adoption of the Hare quota system by the Beijing government on the eve of the transfer of sovereignty of Hong Kong was seen as the measure to curb the dominance of the pro-democracy camp who dominated in the 1995 elections with single-member district (SMD) plurality system, winning 17 of the 20 directly elected seats. Lau Siu-kai, political scientist who served as the convenor of the Subgroup on Electoral Methods for the First Legislature (SEMFL) appointed by National People's Congress explained the reason behind the Beijing installation of the Hare quota largest remainder method:

By installing the single non-transferable vote (SNTV) system, Beijing ensured the pro-Beijing politicians who received only roughly 40 per cent of the support and were defeated by the pro-democratic candidates in 1995 could return a corresponding number of seats in the legislature.

References

Electoral system quotas
Single transferable vote